Cassia fistula, commonly known as golden shower, purging cassia, Indian laburnum, or pudding-pipe tree, is a flowering plant in the family Fabaceae. The species is native to the Indian subcontinent and adjacent regions of Southeast Asia, from southern Pakistan through India and Sri Lanka to Bangladesh, Myanmar and Thailand. It is a popular ornamental plant and is also used in herbal medicine.

Description
The tree has strong and very durable wood, and has been used to construct "Ehela Kanuwa", a site at Adam's Peak, Sri Lanka, which is made of C. fistula (ahala, ehela, or aehaela, ඇහැල in Sinhala ) heartwood. The golden shower tree is not a nitrogen fixer.

Cultivation
Cassia fistula is widely grown as an ornamental plant in tropical and subtropical areas. It blooms in late spring/earlysummer in hot, dry weather. Flowering is profuse, with trees being covered with yellow flowers, many times with almost no leaf being seen. It grows well in dry climates. Growth for this tree is best in full sun on well-drained soil; it is relatively drought-tolerant and slightly salt-tolerant. It will tolerate light brief frost, but can get damaged if the cold persists. It can be subject to mildew or leaf spot, especially during the second half of the growing season. The tree blooms better with pronounced differences between summer and winter temperatures.

Pollinators and seed dispersal
Various species of bees and butterflies are known to be pollinators of C. fistula flowers, especially carpenter bees (Xylocopa sp.). In 1911, Robert Scott Troup conducted an experiment to determine how the seeds of C. fistula are dispersed. He found that golden jackals feed on the fruits and help in seed dispersal.

Uses

Food
In India, flowers of the golden shower tree are sometimes eaten by people. The leaves have also been used to supplement the diets of cattle, sheep, and goats fed with low-quality forages.

Medical
In Ayurvedic medicine, the golden shower tree is known as aragvadha, meaning "disease killer".  The fruit pulp is considered a purgative, and self-medication or any use without medical supervision is strongly advised against in Ayurvedic texts.  Though it has been used in herbalism for millennia, little research has been conducted in modern times, although it is an ingredient in some mass-produced herbal laxatives. When used as such, it is known as "cassia pods".

In India, a cathartic made from the pulp is sometimes added to tobacco.

A paste of the flowers is used as an ointment for pimples.

Culture
Cassia fistula is both the national tree and national flower of Thailand – in Thai ratchaphruek (Thai: ราชพฤกษ์) and the blossoms commonly referred to as dok khun (Thai: ดอกคูน). Its yellow flowers symbolize Thai royalty. A 2006–2007 flower festival, the Royal Flora Ratchaphruek, was named after the tree. Cassia fistula is also featured on a 2003 joint Canadian-Thai design for a 48-cent stamp, part of a series featuring national emblems.

The Indian laburnum is the state flower of Kerala. The flowers are of ritual importance in the Vishu festival of  Kerala. The tree has been depicted on a 20-rupee stamp. The tree is frequently cultivated in Buddhist temples in Sri Lanka where the Sinhala name is Ehela, ඇහැල.

In Laos, its blooming flowers known locally as dok khoun are associated with the Lao New Year. People use the flowers as offerings at the temple and also hang them in their homes for the New Year in belief that the flowers will bring happiness and good luck to the households.

The laburnum is the school tree of National Taiwan Normal University, thought to be because of the seed pods' similarity to the whips used by teachers in times past.

Gallery

References

External links

 (2008): Kerala Symbols

fistula
Flora of tropical Asia
Medicinal plants of Asia
National symbols of Thailand
Plants used in Ayurveda
Plants described in 1753
Taxa named by Carl Linnaeus
Trees in Buddhism